Cyme xantherythra is a moth of the subfamily Arctiinae first described by George Hampson in 1900. It is found in New Guinea.

References

Nudariina
Moths of New Guinea